Bukit Kepong is a mukim in Muar District, Johor, Malaysia. It is located near the Muar River.

History
The town is infamous for the tragic Bukit Kepong Incident. The government has built a museum to commemorate the actions of the Bukit Kepong police force against the communists, colloquially known as Bintang Tiga (Three Stars). Situated near the Muar river, the museum is opened everyday except on Mondays, with an inexpensive entrance fee. Visitors will get a chance to experience the history of the Bukit Kepong incident through its modern and interactive display galleries.

Geography

Bukit Kepong spreads over 256 km2 of land with a population of 10,174 people. One of the restaurant here is the floating restaurant on Muar river famous for its silver catfish (patin in Malay) dishes.

Education

Primary school
Sekolah Kebangsaan Durian Chondong
Sekolah Kebangsaan Bukit Kepong
Sekolah Jenis Kebangsaan (Cina) Kepong

References

Mukims of Muar District